Vitit Muntarbhorn is an international human rights expert and professor of law at Chulalongkorn University in Bangkok, Thailand. Muntarbhorn was designated in September 2016 as the first UN Independent Expert on violence and discrimination based on sexual orientation and gender identity by the Human Rights Council before succeeded by Victor Madrigal-Borloz in 2018.

Biography 
Muntarbhorn, born in November 1952, was educated at Oxford and Free University of Brussels, and was called to the Bar in England before going on to lecture in law at various universities in Austria, Canada, Denmark, England, France, Switzerland and Thailand. He served as the United Nations Special Rapporteur on the sale of children, child prostitution and child pornography from 1990–1994. In 1994, he coedited with C. Taylor a paper on human rights in Thailand. In 2004, he was awarded the UNESCO Prize for Human Rights Education.

Muntarbhorn was nominated to the position of United Nations Special Rapporteur on the Situation of Human Rights in Democratic People's Republic of Korea (North Korea) in 2004. His term ended in June 2010. During his six years of service, North Korea repeatedly rejected his requests for meetings.

Muntarbhorn remains involved in various UN activities, principally as a member of the Committee of Experts on the Application of Conventions and Recommendations of the International Labour Organization, and has served as an expert or consultant with the OHCHR, UNHCR, UNDP, FAO, UNICEF, UNESCO, the WHO and the
United Nations University. He was involved in the elaboration of the Yogyakarta Principles on LGBT rights.

In 2018, he was recipient of the Bonham Centre Award from the Mark S. Bonham Centre for Sexual Diversity Studies. He also was appointed an Honorary Knight Commander of the Order of the British Empire.

Professor Vitit Muntarbhorn was appointed as the Special Rapporteur on the situation of human rights in Cambodia in March 2021.

References 

United Nations special rapporteurs
Living people
Vitit Muntarbhorn
Human rights in North Korea
International law scholars
Vitit Muntarbhorn
Vitit Muntarbhorn
Vitit Muntarbhorn
Honorary Knights Commander of the Order of the British Empire
1952 births
Vitit Muntarbhorn
Vitit Muntarbhorn